A gubernatorial election was held on 9 April 1995 to elect the Governor of Saga Prefecture. Incumbent Isamu Imoto was re-elected.

Candidates
Isamu Imoto - incumbent Governor of Saga Prefecture, age 69
 - high school teacher, age 69

Results

References

Saga gubernatorial elections
1995 elections in Japan